Cheiridopsis speciosa is a species of plant from South Africa.

Description 
The leaves are a pale grey-green in colour with crimped margins. They are lightly keeled and faintly spotted.

Flowers are present between August and September. As with the other species of the genus, the flowers are open during the day and closed at night. The flowers are solitary and with carmine to coppery petals. The centers may be magenta. They may also rarely be pure golden in colour. The anthers are pale yellow.

The fruit is 10-locular and cylindrical.

Distribution and habitat 
This species is endemic to the Northern Cape of South Africa, whre it grows in the dry habitats found in Namaualand. It grows on quartzite outcrops and flats between Lekkersing, Vlakmyn and Spitskloof.

Conservation 
Cheiridopsis speciosa is considered to be of least concern by the South African National Biodiversity Institute.

References 

Flora of South Africa
Namaqualand
Plants described in 1927
speciosa